P.S. Higher Secondary School(Main) is a government-aided school in Mylapore, Chennai. It follows the Tamil Nadu State Board Curriculum. The school offers education for students from the 6th grade till 12th grade. The primary school (grades 1-5) of this institution is located in North Mylapore. It offers groups such as commerce, biology and computer science for students of the 11th and 12th grade.

History
The school started in 1905 in three rented premises, Sarada Vilas and Krishna Vilas in the Mada Streets of Mylapore and a choultry in Ramakrishna Mutt Road. In 1928, it moved into its new buildings on Brodie's Road, set in 36 grounds P.S. Charities had acquired in 1919. Shortly after moving in, the trust leased 80 grounds adjoining the school from Kapaleeswarar Temple to serve as playgrounds. In 1978, the school became a higher secondary school. The school is named as P.S. Higher Secondary School, after its founder, Pennathur Subramania Iyer.

Alumni
 AVM Saravanan
 Sundaram Nainar Sundaram

References

High schools and secondary schools in Chennai
Educational institutions established in 1905
1905 establishments in India